Calytrix superba, commonly known as the superb star-flower, is a species of plant in the myrtle family Myrtaceae that is endemic to Western Australia.

It usually blooms between December and February producing pink-red star-shaped flowers.

Found on flats in a small area in the Mid West between Carnamah, Coorow and Dangara where it grows in sandy lateritic soils.

References

Plants described in 1963
superba
Flora of Western Australia